The 2019 O'Reilly Auto Parts 300 is a NASCAR Xfinity Series race held on November 2, 2019, at Texas Motor Speedway in Fort Worth, Texas. Contested over 200 laps on the  asphalt speedway, it was the 31st race of the 2019 NASCAR Xfinity Series season, fifth race of the Playoffs, and the second race of the Round of 8.

Background

Track

Texas Motor Speedway is a speedway located in the northernmost portion of the U.S. city of Fort Worth, Texas – the portion located in Denton County, Texas. The track measures  around and is banked 24 degrees in the turns, and is of the oval design, where the front straightaway juts outward slightly. The track layout is similar to Atlanta Motor Speedway and Charlotte Motor Speedway (formerly Lowe's Motor Speedway). The track is owned by Speedway Motorsports, Inc., the same company that owns Atlanta and Charlotte Motor Speedways, as well as the short-track Bristol Motor Speedway.

Entry list

Practice

First practice

Final practice

Qualifying

Qualifying results

. – Playoffs driver

Race

Summary
Tyler Reddick began on pole, but Christopher Bell took the lead on lap 6. Bell dominated in the first half, winning both stages. 

When the final stage began, Austin Cindric grabbed the lead and led until Chase Briscoe had a flat right rear tire and made contact with the wall, bringing out a caution on lap 129. Reddick briefly got the lead but lost it to Chastain, who took and kept the lead on lap 144. 

On lap 151, Noah Gragson tried to squeeze between Harrison Burton and Jeb Burton. He got tapped by Harrison and wrecked his car after spinning through the grass for his first DNF of 2019. The race was briefly red-flagged.

Chastain continued to lead on the restart, but Reddick hit the inside wall and brought out a late caution. Briscoe was also struggling as his right front tire disintegrated with 25 laps remaining, but NASCAR didn’t throw a caution. This forced Briscoe to ultimately finish 22nd.

Bell regained the lead on the lap 170 restart and he never looked back. He ultimately took the win, leading 101 laps  and finishing ahead of Chastain by 5 seconds. Bell also secured a spot in the Championship race at Homestead-Miami Speedway.
After the race, Briscoe, Michael Annett, Cindric, and Gragson were below the playoffs cutoff point.

Stage Results

Stage One
Laps: 45

Stage Two
Laps: 45

Final Stage Results

Stage Three
Laps: 110

. – Driver advanced to the next round of the playoffs.

. – Playoffs driver

References

2019 in sports in Texas
NASCAR races at Texas Motor Speedway
O'Reilly Auto Parts 300
2019 NASCAR Xfinity Series